Austrosynotis is a genus of flowering plants in the daisy family.

There is only one known species, Austrosynotis rectirama, native to Malawi and Tanzania.

References

Senecioneae
Monotypic Asteraceae genera
Taxa named by John Gilbert Baker